Skagen Lighthouse, also known as Skagen's Grey Lighthouse (Det Grå Fyr), is an active lighthouse  northeast of Skagen in the far north of Jutland, Denmark. Designed by architect Niels Sigfred Nebelong, it was brought into operation on 1 November 1858.

Description
Skagen's first lighthouse, the White Lighthouse (Det Hvide Fyr), designed by Philip de Lange and completed in 1747, was the first lighthouse in Denmark to be built in brick. The two-storey keeper's house to which it is attached is painted bright yellow. When it was built it was more or less at the centre of the Skagen Odde peninsula, but as a result of coastal erosion, it is now very near the Kattegat coast to the southeast.

The lighthouse has a two-ton rotating lens resting on mercury. Originally there was a five-wicked paraffin lamp which was successively replaced with a 1,000 Watt then a 1,500 Watt electric lamp. Today there is a 400 Watt sodium lamp which every four seconds can be seen up to 37 km (20 mi) away.

Until 1952 Skagen Lighthouse was the country's tallest. Dueodde Lighthouse on Bornholm is now just one meter higher.

In 2017 the lighthouse was launched as a new international bird center Skagen Grey Lighthouse - Center for Migratory birds. The center consist of an interactive exhibition and a working bird observatory -Skagen Bird Observatory. Skagen and the Grenen area is known for its wide range of migrating birds, so the lighthouse is a perfect place for birdwatching.

Open to visitors
The lighthouse is open to visitors all year except on Christmas and New Year's Eve. Daily opening hours are 10 am to 4 pm in the winter season and until 6pm in the summertime

See also

List of lighthouses and lightvessels in Denmark

References

Literature

Lighthouses completed in 1888
Lighthouses in Denmark
Buildings and structures in Skagen
Tourist attractions in the North Jutland Region
Niels Sigfred Nebelong buildings